OddLot Entertainment was an American independent film studio, founded by Gigi Pritzker and Deborah Del Prete in 2001, which dealt with financing and production of films.

History

OddLot Entertainment
In 2013 OddLot has produced a cinematic version of Ender's Game. The cinematic version of the film was in development, in one form or another, for over a decade until its premiere. In the same year, OddLot signed a multi-year distribution and co-financing agreement with Lionsgate. OddLot and Lionsgate have previously collaborated on the production of Draft Day and Ender's Game. The collaboration officially began with the production of Mortdecai, an action comedy that was released in 2015.

DarkLot Entertainment
OddLot has launched horror production division DarkLot Entertainment, has produced films such as Undead or Alive: The Zombedy, Buried Alive, Living Hell and The Spirit.

List of produced films

as OddLot Entertainment

as DarkLot Entertainment

References

External links
Official website (archived)

2001 establishments in California
2015 disestablishments in California
American companies established in 2001
American companies disestablished in 2015
American independent film studios
Companies based in Culver City, California
Defunct American film studios
Defunct companies based in Greater Los Angeles
Entertainment companies based in California
Mass media companies established in 2001
Mass media companies disestablished in 2015